The women's speed skating 200 metres time trial in roller sports at the 2015 Pan American Games was held on July 12 at the St. John Paul II Catholic Secondary School in Toronto.

Schedule
All times are Central Standard Time (UTC-6).

Results
12 athletes from 12 countries competed.

References

Roller sports at the 2015 Pan American Games